The Lion Man is a New Zealand television documentary series about a New Zealand big cat park called Zion Wildlife Gardens. The series was named after Craig Busch, the park's founder, who had styled himself as "the Lion Man". The series followed Busch and the park's employees as they managed the park and its collection of approximately 30 lions and tigers of various species, and other animals. As well as first-hand comment from Busch and his staff, the series was narrated throughout by Paul Casserley in New Zealand and actor Miles Anderson in the United Kingdom.

The series also showed Busch during related promotional activities as well as his various wildlife missions abroad, including trips to Africa and Thailand. The Lion Man was one of New Zealand's most successful television series, showing in 93 countries worldwide, including Sky1 in the United Kingdom.

Three series were produced, the first of which began screening in New Zealand on 17 June 2004.  The first two series were commissioned by state broadcaster TVNZ, but a third series looked in doubt following Busch's conviction in 2007 for assaulting his ex-wife at the park in 2005. Independent funding was found to produce the third series and TVNZ decided to broadcast it after determining that there was still popular demand for the show. The show was produced by Great Southern Television. All three series' music was composed by Peter Blake and the theme tune lyrics written by Bob Smith.

The show highlighted the activities of the park, including the birth of cubs from different species, and the filming of lions for television adverts and other promotions. As well as its visitor income and these promotions, the series itself became a source of vital funding for the park.

The Lion Man did broadcast in the United Kingdom on Sky3 (now Pick) but no longer does.

Episodes

Series One
Series One aired in 2004.

Series Two
Series Two aired in 2005.

Series Three
Series Three aired in 2007.

Animals
These are the animals that were at the park at some point while filming was taking place. Most appeared in the series.

Lions
Zion
Shia
Shikira
Sampson
Shania
Abdullah
Cleo
Tshaka
Aslan
Cora
Jabu
Narnia
Tanza
Savannah
Shumba
Zamba

White Lions
Gandor
Laduma
Amafu
Imvula
Marah
Moya
Sabie
Sibili
Timba
Themba

Tigers
Shikana
Sita
Indira
Kahli

White Tigers
Abu
Jahdu
Rewa
Tygo
Azra
Anila
Kala
Shanti
Rongo
Kiwi
Khan
Aotea
Tane

Other
Foxy - Baboon
Mandla - Black Leopard
Zoe - Serval
Silas - Serval
Kenya - Cheetah
Thabo - Cheetah

References

External links 
 The Lion Man page at the Great Southern Television website
 Official Lionman website
 

Television series about lions
New Zealand documentary television series
2004 New Zealand television series debuts
TVNZ original programming